Grand Prix Wrestling (GPW) is a professional wrestling promotion run and owned by Emile Duprée. Grand Prix Wrestling tours parts of New Brunswick, Prince Edward Island, and Nova Scotia. It has no connection with Paul Vachon's Grand Prix Wrestling promotion of Montreal in the 1970s.

History

Atlantic Grand Prix Wrestling
Originally known as Atlantic Grand Prix Wrestling (AGPW), the regional circuit has been around since the early 1960s. During the 60s and the 70s AGPW was so popular it became a hit in the Maritimes. AGPW cards were held in Moncton, New Brunswick on Monday nights, Halifax, Nova Scotia on Thursdays, Berwick, Nova Scotia on Saturday evenings and along other small towns in New Brunswick, Nova Scotia, and Prince Edward Island.

Every summer, there were two big titles up for grabs: The United States Heavyweight Championship and the North American Tag Team Championship. Other titles included the European Heavyweight Championship and the Maritime Heavyweight Championship. The European Heavyweight Title was held more by Killer Karl Krupp than any other wrestler and The Maritime Heavyweight Title was held most often by Stephen Petitpas. During the late 1980s, the United States Heavyweight Championship was changed to the International Heavyweight Championship.

Rising Sun In The Maritimes Tour
Atlantic Grand Prix Wrestling returned to the Maritimes in 2013 for a summer tour. The roster featured former WWE wrestler Rene Dupree, All Japan Pro Wrestling star Seiya Sanada, She Nay Nay, Bellatrix star Erin Angel, midget wrestlers Lil' Fabio and Lil' Poppa Pump, The Masked Thunderbolt, Kwan Chang, Jeremy Prophet, Bobby Sharp, Spiderman and Japanese star, Daiki Inaba.  The tour kicked off in Borden-Carleton, Prince Edward Island with a show featuring a special guest appearance by Japanese legend The Great Muta.

The tour continued with Prince Edward Island shows in Souris and O'Leary. Nova Scotia shows included: Springhill, Bridgewater, two in Berwick, Tatamagouche, Truro, Cheticamp, North Sydney, Baddeck and Antigonish. The New Brunswick portion of the tour included shows in: Cocagne (3 times), Neguac, Lameque, Chipman, Fredericton Junction, Blacks Harbour, Baie St. Anne, Minto, Petit-Rocher, Doaktown and Sunny Corner. The tour was very successful and it brought a lot of escalation toward what is now known as the 2014 New Era Tour that featured Rene Dupree, Yasufumi Nakanoue, Butcher Vachon, Bobby Sharp, Jeremy Prophet, the return of the Cuban Assassin and many more. Towns featured on the tour included Neguac, Black's Harbour and Minto (New Brunswick), O'Leary, Borden-Carleton and Souris (Prince Edward Island), and Sydney, Baddeck, Berwick, Truro and Springhill (Nova Scotia).

Eastern Canada Tour
In May 2015, AGPW held a tour across Nova Scotia, New Brunswick and Prince Edward Island.

Alumni
Male wrestlers

Female wrestlers

Midget wrestlers

Stables and tag teams

Championships
Key

AGPW International Heavyweight Championship

AGPW United States Heavyweight Championship

AGPW Maritimes Heavyweight Championship

AGPW North American Tag Team Championship

Footnotes

References

External links
 Atlantic Grand Prix Wrestling Facebook Page  Maintained by Jeff Docherty
Wrestling-Titles.com: Grand Prix Wrestling
SLAM! Wrestling: Grand Prix does down by Greg Oliver
SLAM! Wrestling: Grand Prix stares down newcomer Real Action - The pending fight over The Maritimes by Greg Oliver
SLAM! Wrestling: Grand Prix a learning environment by Greg Oliver
SLAM! Wrestling: Grand Prix restarts June 7 in Maritimes by Greg Oliver
SLAM! Wrestling: Pat Casey's Grand Prix Photo Gallery
Regional Territories: Atlantic Grand Prix Wrestling by Serge Niles
Atlantic Grand Prix Wrestling at Online World of Wrestling

Canadian professional wrestling promotions
Professional wrestling in New Brunswick